Third-seeded Tony Roche defeated István Gulyás 6–1, 6–4, 7–5 in the final to win the men's singles tennis title at the 1966 French Championships.

Seeds
The seeded players are listed below. Tony Roche is the champion; others show the round in which they were eliminated.

  Fred Stolle (quarterfinals)
  Roy Emerson (quarterfinals)
  Tony Roche (champion)
  Nicola Pietrangeli (third round)
  John Newcombe (third round)
  Dennis Ralston (fourth round)
  Cliff Richey (third round)
  Cliff Drysdale (semifinals)
  Pierre Darmon (fourth round)
  François Jauffret (semifinals)
  Martin Mulligan (third round)
  Thomaz Koch (third round)
  Michael Sangster (second round)
  Juan Gisbert (fourth round)
  Jaidip Mukerjea (fourth round)
  Tom Okker (fourth round)

Draw

Key
 Q = Qualifier
 WC = Wild card
 LL = Lucky loser
 r = Retired

Finals

Earlier rounds

Section 1

Section 2

Section 3

Section 4

Section 5

Section 6

Section 7

Section 8

External links
   on the French Open website

1966
1966 in French tennis